Oliver Patric Neuville (born 1 May 1973) is a German former footballer who played as a striker.

During an 18-year professional career he played mainly for Bayer Leverkusen (five seasons) and Borussia Mönchengladbach (six), amassing Bundesliga totals of 334 games and 91 goals.

Neuville appeared nearly 70 times for the Germany national team during one full decade, representing Germany in two World Cups and at Euro 2008.

Club career
Born in Locarno, Switzerland, to a German father from Aachen and Swiss mother of Italian descent, Neuville started his professional career with Servette FC. In only his second season in the Swiss Super League, he scored a career-best 16 goals to help the club win the national championship after a nine-year wait.

In 1996–97, Neuville played in Spain with CD Tenerife, where he was part of a well-balanced attacking line that also featured Juanele (eight goals), Meho Kodro (six), Antonio Pinilla (seven) and Aurelio Vidmar (one), netting five goals in 1,885 minutes as the Canary Islands team easily retained their La Liga status, and also playing a relatively important part in their semi-final run in the UEFA Cup. Subsequently, he moved to Germany and signed for F.C. Hansa Rostock, scoring eight times in only 17 contests in his debut campaign in the Bundesliga, as the side from the former East Germany finished sixth.

Neuville signed for Bayer 04 Leverkusen in the 1999 summer, quickly becoming an essential offensive figure for his new club. He scored 28 goals combined from 2000 to 2002 (including a hat-trick against Hamburger SV on 24 November 2001), while also adding five in 15 UEFA Champions League appearances in 2001–02, as Bayer finished second to Real Madrid (he scored one apiece in both legs of the semifinal clash against Manchester United); the club also finished second in the league during this timeframe.

Aged 31, Neuville joined Borussia Mönchengladbach for 2004–05, on a free transfer. On 17 October 2004 he scored an infamous goal with his hand against 1. FC Kaiserslautern in a 2–0 home win, which was widely reviled and landed him a two-match ban. He netted 22 goals in his first two seasons combined, but appeared scarcely as the Foals dropped down a level in 2007, mainly due to injury.

Neuville returned to form in 2007–08, scoring 15 goals to help Borussia return to the top flight the immediate campaign after, the competition's sixth-best. He made his last Bundesliga appearance on the final matchday of the 2009–10 season, against former team Bayer Leverkusen.

It was planned that Neuville would start to work as a youth coach for Borussia Mönchengladbach. Instead, he decided to play one more year and signed for Arminia Bielefeld in the 2. Bundesliga. However, after only a couple of months, he left by mutual consent, retiring at the age of 37.

International career
After electing to represent Germany at international level, Neuville made his international debut on 2 September 1998 against Malta, in a friendly, replacing Mario Basler for the last fifteen minutes of the 2–1 away win. In his first months training with the national team he needed an interpreter to understand coach Erich Ribbeck's message, while getting his across as well.

Subsequently, Neuville went on to collect 69 caps with ten goals. He was picked for the squad that finished second at the 2002 FIFA World Cup, scoring the game's only goal in the round-of-16 win against Paraguay.

After missing selection for UEFA Euro 2004, in the second group stage match of the 2006 World Cup against Poland, Neuville, who had replaced Lukas Podolski, buried a desperate injury-time cross from fellow substitute David Odonkor, beating goalkeeper Artur Boruc on the way to a 1–0 victory. He did not score again for the national team until 31 May 2008, when he slid in a Marcell Jansen cross in a Euro 2008 warm-up against Serbia, appearing in the tournament's final stages in the Group B match against Austria as a late substitute, and retiring from international play at the age of 35.

Personal life
Along with Bernd Schneider, Neuville was one of the two known smokers in the German national team. His name (properly pronounced in French – not German – fashion) stemmed from his Belgian grandfather.

In 1997, Neuville fathered son Lars-Oliver.

Career statistics

Club

International
Scores and results list Germany's goal tally first, score column indicates score after each Neuville goal.

Honours
Servette
Swiss League: 1993–94

Bayer Leverkusen
UEFA Champions League runner-up: 2001–02
DFB-Pokal runner-up: 2001–02

Borussia Mönchengladbach
2. Bundesliga: 2007–08

Germany
FIFA World Cup runner-up: 2002; Third place 2006
UEFA European Championship runner-up: 2008
FIFA Confederations Cup third place: 2005

References

External links

Leverkusen who's who

1973 births
Living people
People from Locarno
Swiss people of Italian descent
Swiss people of German descent
Swiss people of Belgian descent
Swiss people of Walloon descent
German sportspeople of Italian descent
German people of Swiss descent
German people of Belgian descent
German people of Walloon descent
German people of Calabrian descent
Swiss-German people
Citizens of Germany through descent
Swiss men's footballers
German footballers
Association football forwards
Germany international footballers
Swiss Super League players
FC Locarno players
Servette FC players
La Liga players
CD Tenerife players
Bundesliga players
2. Bundesliga players
FC Hansa Rostock players
Bayer 04 Leverkusen players
Borussia Mönchengladbach players
Arminia Bielefeld players
1999 FIFA Confederations Cup players
2002 FIFA World Cup players
2006 FIFA World Cup players
UEFA Euro 2008 players
Swiss expatriate footballers
German expatriate sportspeople in Switzerland
Expatriate footballers in Switzerland
Swiss expatriate sportspeople in Spain
Expatriate footballers in Spain
Swiss expatriate sportspeople in Germany
Expatriate footballers in Germany
Sportspeople from Ticino